Halystina globulus is a species of sea snail, a marine gastropod mollusk in the family Seguenziidae.

Description
The height of the shell attains 2 mm.

Distribution
This marine species occurs off the Philippines.

References

External links
 

globulus
Gastropods described in 2006